Star Wars is an epic science fantasy saga created by George Lucas.

Star Wars may also refer to:

Star Wars franchise
Media within the franchise that have had the specific name Star Wars include:

Film
Star Wars (film), 1977 film, also known as Star Wars Episode IV: A New Hope

Music
 Star Wars (soundtrack), 1977 soundtrack album for the film

Comics
 Star Wars comics, adaptations by Marvel Comics and Dark Horse Comics
 Star Wars (1977 comic book), Marvel Comics comic book series printed between 1977 and 1986, with a one-shot issue published in 2019
 Star Wars (manga), adaptations of the first four films
 Star Wars (UK comics), a UK comic book series by Titan Magazines

Books
Star Wars: From the Adventures of Luke Skywalker, 1976 novelization of the 1977 film
List of Star Wars Books, a comprehensive list and vguide to the books in the Star Wars universe

Radio
Star Wars (radio series), adaptation produced in 1981, 1983, and 1996

Arcade games
Star Wars (1983 video game)
Star Wars (1987 video game)
Star Wars (1991 video game)
Star Wars (1992 pinball)

Roleplaying games
Star Wars: The Roleplaying Game (West End Games), D6 System, licensed from 1987 to 1999.
Star Wars Roleplaying Game (Wizards of the Coast), D20 System, licensed from 2000 to 2010
Star Wars Roleplaying Game (Fantasy Flight Games), Narrative Dice System, licensed from 2012 to 2019

Other uses
Starwars (board game), a 1977 board game
Strategic Defense Initiative, a United States missile defense program known informally as "Star Wars" in reference to the film
Star Wars (Wilco album), 2015 album by American alternative rock band Wilco
Star Wars (Indian TV series), a Tamil reality TV show

See also
 Star war, a Mayan conflict of the 1st millennium CE
Warstar (disambiguation)